The United Arab Emirates is scheduled to compete in the 2017 Asian Winter Games in Sapporo and Obihiro, Japan from February 19 to 26. The country is scheduled to compete in two sports (figure skating and hockey).

Competitors
The following table lists the Emirati delegation per sport and gender.

Figure skating

United Arab Emirates is scheduled to compete in the women's figure skating competition. This will mark the country's Asian Winter Games debut in the sport.

Ice hockey

The United Arab Emirates has entered a men's hockey team. The team will compete in division one. The United Arab Emirates finished in third place (7th place overall) in division 1 of the competition.

Men's tournament

United Arab Emirates was represented by the following 23 athletes:

Faisal Al Suwaidi 
Hazaa Al Saadi
Ahmed Al Suwaidi 
Said Al Amri
Saeed Al Nuaimi
Ahmed Atiq Al Dhaheri
Faisal Al Blooshi
Ali Mohamed Al Hadad
Ayez Ahmad Al Muhairbi
Mohamed Al Dhaheri
Mohammad Saeed Al Junaibi
Juma Al Dhaheri
Omar Ali Al Shamisi
Mohamed Saeed Al Shamisi
Mohamed Hamad Al Dhaheri
Suhail Al Mehairi
Salim Al Yafei
Obaid Al Al Muharrami
Khalifa Al Mahrouqi
Khalid Al Suwaidi
Theyab Ali Al Sabousi
Mohamed Al Zaabi
Mohamed Rashid Al Kaabi

Legend: G = Goalie, D = Defense-man, F = Forward

References

Nations at the 2017 Asian Winter Games
Asian Winter Games
United Arab Emirates at the Asian Winter Games